ACST may refer to:

 American Cooperative School of Tunis, a private international school in La Goulette, Tunisia
 Australian Central Standard Time, a time zone (UTC+9:30)